Carol Antonia Roberts (born June 22, 1936) is a Florida politician of the Democratic Party.  She is best known for her part in the 2000 Florida election recount, where she served on the Palm Beach County canvassing board.

In 2002, she ran unsuccessfully for Florida's 22nd congressional district seat in the U.S. House of Representatives against Republican incumbent E. Clay Shaw, Jr., finishing with 38 percent of the vote.

She previously served as mayor and city commissioner of West Palm Beach, and as a county commissioner of Palm Beach County, Florida.

She was married to Dr. Hyman J. Roberts, by whom she has six children. For two years (1986–88) she was National President of ACTS, a private foundation assisting communities to Self Help. She served as ACTS' representative for famine relief in East Africa.

Carol and Hyman Roberts have been benefactors to several universities, museums, art galleries and charities. She has volunteered her time on the board of directors for numerous non-profit, educational and civil rights organizations.

References

External links
News photos of Carol Roberts during the 2000 Presidential Recount
Associated Press Biography from 2002 election
Biography (1997) from National Association of Counties

1936 births
Living people
Mayors of West Palm Beach, Florida
Activists from Florida
American philanthropists
County commissioners in Florida
People from Palm Beach, Florida
Florida Democrats
Florida city council members
Women in Florida politics
Women city councillors in Florida
21st-century American women